William Golightly (1875 – 18 September 1940) was a British trade unionist and politician.

Born in Felling, Golightly began working underground at Seghill Colliery at an early age.  He gradually progressed to become a deputy-overman, serving for eight years until he resigned in protest at the management methods he was asked to use.  He was active in the Northumberland Miners' Association, acting as a branch delegate for thirty years, and he served on the union's executive for three years.

Golightly served in the British Army in France during World War I, then returned to mining.  He was elected to Seghill Council, and then later also to Northumberland County Council, representing the Labour Party.  In 1927, he was elected as the president of the Northumberland Miners' Association.  The union was affiliated to the Miners' Federation of Great Britain, and Golightly served on its executive from 1939.  He also served as the union's compensation secretary, in which role he was known as being efficient but strict.

In 1940, Golightly travelled to the United States on the SS City of Benares.  The ship was hit by a torpedo and sank, killing Golightly.

In his spare time, Golightly was a Methodist lay preacher, and he also served on the Co-operative Wages Board.  His descendants include the actor Robson Green.

References

1875 births
1940 deaths
British Army personnel of World War I
British civilians killed in World War II
Councillors in Northumberland
Labour Party (UK) councillors
People from Felling
Politicians from Tyne and Wear
Trade unionists from Tyne and Wear
Deaths due to shipwreck at sea
Presidents of British trade unions